The Manus Island mosaic-tailed rat or Manus melomys (Melomys matambuai) is a species of rodent in the family Muridae.
It is endemic to the island of Manus in Papua New Guinea where it occurs in forest habitats and is largely arboreal.

References

Melomys
Rats of Asia
Endemic fauna of Papua New Guinea
Rodents of Papua New Guinea
Endangered fauna of Asia
Mammals described in 1994
Taxa named by Tim Flannery
Taxa named by Donald J. Colgan